The 1971–72 The Floridians season was the fourth and final season of American Basketball Association in Florida. For this season, 34 games were played in Miami, with the other home games being played in either Tampa or St. Petersberg. The Floridians edged out the Carolina Cougars for the final playoff spot by one game, with their 116–115 overtime victory proving key to clinching the spot, as their record was 35–45 and the Cougars record was at 33–49, with the Floridians not only having two more games to play than the Cougars but only needing to win once more to officially clinch, which they did four days later versus the Memphis Pros, 118–107. The team's biggest winning streak all season was 4, with their first half record being 19–23. They went 17–25 in the second half of the season, with a season high six game losing streak in that half. They finished 8th in points scored, at 112.8 per game and 8th in points allowed at 114.3 per game. In the Semifinals, they were swept by the Virginia Squires. After the season, the team was disbanded, due to attendance not improving despite trying to appeal to the region. Pro basketball would not return to the area until 1988 with the Miami Heat, who have worn throwback jerseys of the team on occasion as part of "Hardwood Classics Nights", doing so for the first time during the 2005–06 season.

Roster
 -- Will Allen - Power forward
 21 Mack Calvin - Point guard
 -- Rick Fisher - Power forward
 11 Ronald Franz - Small forward
 51 Carl Fuller  - Center
 41 Ira Harge - Center
 15 Warren Jabali - Shooting guard
 32 Larry Jones - Shooting guard
 43 Manny Leaks - Center
 30 Willie Long - Power forward
 43 Walt Piatkowski - Power forward
 51 Craig Raymond - Center
 31 Sam Robinson - Small forward
 44 George Tinsley - Small forward
 12 Al Tucker - Power forward
 20 Lonnie Wright - Point guard

Final standings

Eastern Division

Playoffs
Eastern Division Semifinals

The Floridians lose series, 4–0

Awards and honors
1972 ABA All-Star Game selections (game played on January 29, 1972)
 Mack Calvin
 Warren Jabali

References

 Floridians on Basketball Reference

External links
 RememberTheABA.com 1971-72 regular season and playoff results
 The Floridians page

Miami Floridians seasons
The Floridians
The Floridians, 1971-72
The Floridians, 1971-72